Brittany Marie Amaradio (born 1993), known professionally as Delacey, is an American singer and songwriter. Having co-written songs such as "New York City" for The Chainsmokers, "Ruin the Friendship" for Demi Lovato, and "Without Me" for Halsey (which reached number one on the Billboard Hot 100), in March 2020, she released her debut album, Black Coffee. She is currently working on her sophomore album The Girl Has A Dream, featuring single "Boy With The Blues."

Early life 
Amaradio was born and raised in San Juan Capistrano in Orange County, California. Picking up the piano and songwriting at seven years old, Amaradio cites her early influences as Stevie Nicks and Billie Holiday, a taste she acquired from her father's vinyl collection. Upon graduating from Capistrano Valley High School, Amaradio briefly moved to Manhattan where she worked as a photographer by day and worked open mics at night. During this time, she wrote "New York City" about her struggles in New York. Upon returning to the West Coast, she adopted the pseudonym "Delacey."

Discography

Studio albums

Singles

As lead artist

As featured artist

Promotional singles

Music videos

As lead artist

As featured artist

Songwriting credits

References

External links
 

1993 births
American women singer-songwriters
Living people
21st-century American women